Oakmont, also known as the William Albion Dunn House, is a historic home located at Greenville, Pitt County, North Carolina.  It was designed by the architectural firm Benton & Benton and built in 1930.  It is a two-story, five bay Colonial Revival frame dwelling with projecting frame wings, a screened porch and porte cochere and an open porch and rear sun room.  Also on the property are the contributing garage (c. 1931), playhouse (c. 1931), and house site.

It was added to the National Register of Historic Places in 2001.

References

Houses on the National Register of Historic Places in North Carolina
Colonial Revival architecture in North Carolina
Houses completed in 1930
Houses in Pitt County, North Carolina
National Register of Historic Places in Greenville, North Carolina